Wally is the 1974 eponymous first album by the band Wally. While the band fitted broadly into the progressive rock category, there was more than a hint of country / rock about the album, especially with Paul Middleton's steel guitar. The album is very much of its time, and shows influences of The Byrds, Crosby, Stills & Nash and the like. Wally, produced by Bob Harris and Rick Wakeman was not a huge commercial success, but has gained and maintained a loyal following, to the extent that the album has recently been re-released on CD.

Roy Webber has returned to music after many years involved in his original profession of graphics, and recorded a new album with Will Jackson in 2006.

The track "The Martyr" was released as a single in 1975.

Track listing 
Side One
"The Martyr" (Paul Gerrett) – 8:05
"I Just Wanna Be a Cowboy" (Roy Webber) – 4:09
"What to Do" (Roy Webber) – 7:38

Side Two
"Sunday Walking Lady" (Roy Webber) – 2:45
"To the Urban Man" (Jim Slade, Roy Webber) – 13:58
"Your Own Way" (Alan Craig, Roy Webber, strings arranged by Bob Harris & Rick Wakeman) – 5:39

Personnel
Wally
 Roy Webber – lead vocals, acoustic guitar
 Pete Cosker – lead electric and acoustic guitars, vocals, bass guitar
 Paul Gerrett – Fender Rhodes electric piano, Hammond organ, Mellotron, harmonium, grand piano, harpsichord, vocals
 Pete Sage – electric violin, bass guitar, mandolin
 Paul Middleton – lap steel guitar, bass guitar
 Roger Narraway – drums, percussion

Production credits 
 Produced by Bob Harris, Rick Wakeman
 Engineered by Paul Tregurtha
 Recorded at Morgan Studios, London
 String arrangements on "Your Own Way" by Bob Harris, Rick Wakeman

References

External links 
 Wally - Wally (1974) album review by ??, credits & releases at AllMusic
 Wally - Wally (1974) album releases & credits at Discogs.com
 Wally - Wally (1974) album credits & user reviews at ProgArchives.com
 Wally - Wally (1974) album to be listened as stream at Spotify.com

1974 debut albums
Wally (band) albums
Atlantic Records albums
Albums recorded at Morgan Sound Studios